Frank James (18431915) was a Confederate soldier, outlaw, and older brother of Jesse James.

Frank James may also refer to:

 Frank A. James III (born 1953), American theologian and academic administrator
 Frank B. James (19122004), American general in the United States Air Force
 Frank Cyril James (19031973), Canadian academic and principal of McGill University
 Frank James (MP) (18211924), British businessman and politician 
 Frank Linsly James (18511890), English explorer
 Frank Robert James (born 1959), suspect in the 2022 New York City Subway attack
 W. Frank James (18731945), American soldier and politician from Michigan
 Frank "Springback" James, American blues and boogie-woogie pianist, singer, and songwriter

See also 
 
 Francis James (disambiguation)